Patrick Dixon (born 1957) is an author and business consultant, often described as a futurist, and chairman of the trends forecasting company Global Change Ltd. He is also founder of the international AIDS agency ACET and Chairman of the ACET International Alliance.

In 2005, he was ranked as one of the 20 most influential business thinkers alive according to the Thinkers 50 (a private survey printed in 'The Times').
Dixon was also included in the Independent on Sundays 2010 "Happy List", regarding ACET and his other work tackling the stigma of AIDS.

Medical career
Patrick Dixon studied Medical Sciences at King's College, Cambridge and continued medical training at Charing Cross Hospital, London. In 1978, while a medical student, he founded the IT startup Medicom, selling medical software solutions in the UK and the Middle East, based on early personal computers. After qualifying as a physician, he cared for people dying of cancer at St Joseph's Hospice and then as part of the Community Care Team based at University College Hospital, London, while also continuing IT consulting part-time.

In 1988 he launched the AIDS charity ACET, following the publication of his first book The Truth about AIDS, which warned of an unfolding catastrophe that has since hit many nations in sub-Saharan Africa. ACET grew rapidly, providing home care services across London and other parts of the UK, and a national sex education programme in schools which reached more than 450,000 students.

Dixon no longer practices as a physician but remains actively involved as Chairman of the ACET International Alliance. This is now a network of independent national AIDS care and prevention programmes, sharing the same name and values, active in 23 countries in Europe, Africa, and Asia.

Trends analysis, business consulting and writing
Patrick Dixon now advises large corporations in many different industries on trends, strategy, risk management and opportunities for innovation, giving keynotes to thousands of business leaders at corporate events each year.

Since the 1990s Dixon has written 15 books covering a wide range of issues and macro-trends, including social media, multichannel marketing, consumer shifts, demographics, rise of emerging economies, health care, biotechnology, social issues, sustainability, politics and business ethics.

Futurewise, first published in 1998, uses the word FUTURE as a mnemonic standing for "Six Faces of the Future," which will impact every large business: Fast, Urban, Tribal, Universal, Radical and E'''thical. Dixon is optimistic about the capacity of human innovation to solve complex challenges: This millennium will witness the greatest challenges to human survival that we have ever seen, and many of them will face us in the early years of the first century.  It will also provide us with science and technology beyond our greatest imaginings and the greatest shift in values for over 50 years. Futurewise, page xiBuilding a Better Business, published in 2005, describes a new approach to leadership, management, marketing, teams, brands, customer relations, innovation, strategy, corporate governance and values. The book applies lessons from volunteering and non-profit organisations in motivating and inspiring many people to achieve great things. In it, Dixon argues that all successful leadership derives from an appeal to a common desire for a better future—for customers, workers, shareholders and communities.  He attacks the "dangerous" obsession with shareholder value in many global corporations: Sustainagility, published in 2010 and co-authored by Johan Gorecki, describes green technology and innovations across a wide range of industries, which Dixon believes will help to transform and protect the world.

Personal life
Dixon is married to Sheila, with four grown-up children, including the pop artist Paul Dixon (known as Fyfe, previously David's Lyre), and lives in London, where the family is active in the local church and community life.

Works
Patrick Dixon publishes video messages on his web TV site. He claims over 15 million viewers, and YouTube shows over 5 million video views on his channel there.

BooksThe Thinkers 50 noted Dixon's relaxed attitude to his own intellectual capital, in that he makes much of it available from the Global Change website without charge.Books by Dixon, GlobalChange.comThe Truth about AIDS – Kingsway / ACET International Alliance 1987, 1989, 1994, new edition 2004AIDS and Young People – Kingsway 1989 AIDS and You – Kingsway / ACET Int. All. 1990, 2004The Genetic Revolution – Kingsway 1993, 1995The Rising Price of Love – Kingsway 1994Signs of Revival – Kingsway 1994, 1995 Out of the Ghetto – Word 1995The Truth about Westminster – Kingsway 1995The Truth about Drugs – Hodder 1996Cyberchurch – Kingsway 1996Futurewise – HarperCollins 1998, 2001, Profile Books 2003, reprinted 2004, 2005, 4th edition 2007Island of Bolay – HarperCollins 2000 – thrillerBuilding a Better Business – Profile Books 2005Sustainagility'' – Kogan Page 2010

Selected articles
Wake up to stronger tribes and a longer life – Financial Times

References

External links 

http://pdixon.blogspot.com – blog comment on recent events

British non-fiction writers
British thriller writers
Futurologists
British business theorists
British businesspeople
Business speakers
English writers
Alumni of King's College, Cambridge
1957 births
Living people
HIV/AIDS activists
Alumni of Charing Cross Medical School
English male novelists
Male non-fiction writers